

Theodor Kretschmer (26 November 1901 – 5 December 1986) was a general in the Wehrmacht of Nazi Germany during World War II.  He was a recipient of the Knight's Cross of the Iron Cross.

Military career
Kretschmer joined the German Army in 1919 and was commissioned in 1924. After a number of staff positions he briefly became commander of the 16th Panzer-Division in late 1944 before taking over as the commander of the 17th Panzer Division on 1 February 1945. Kretschmer was promoted to Major General on 1 April 1945. He surrendered his division on 11 May 1945 east of Prague. Convicted in the Soviet Union as a war criminal, he was held until 1955.

Awards and decorations
 Knight's Cross of the Iron Cross on 8 March 1945 as Oberst and commander of 17. Panzer-Division

References

Citations

Bibliography

 
 
 

1901 births
1986 deaths
People from Fulda (district)
People from Hesse-Nassau
Major generals of the German Army (Wehrmacht)
Recipients of the Gold German Cross
Recipients of the Knight's Cross of the Iron Cross
German prisoners of war in World War II held by the Soviet Union
Military personnel from Hesse